Hunstanton Lifeboat Station is a Royal National Lifeboat Institution operated lifeboat station located in the village of Old Hunstanton in the English county of Norfolk. This is the only lifeboat station on the east coast of England which faces westward, being positioned on the east side of the square-mouthed bay and estuary known as The Wash.

The station currently has two lifeboats: B-class Atlantic 85 lifeboat, Spirit of West Norfolk (B-848), since 23 May 2011 and H-class Hovercraft Hunstanton Flyer (Civil Service No. 45) (H-003).

History

1824–1900: origins and expansion 
The first lifeboat station to be established in Hunstanton was formed by the Norfolk Shipwreck Association in 1824.

In 1867 the Royal National Lifeboat Institution (RNLI) took over the running of the station and constructed a new boathouse close to the location of the original, which had been demolished by then. A local committee was formed to run the station. The RNLI station's first lifeboat was the Licensed Victuallers, which was funded from donations by the Licensed Victuallers’ Lifeboat Fund and delivered free of coast to the station by the Great Eastern Railway. delivered the boat and its equipment free of cost. She was on station from 1867 to 1887, during which time she was launched 21 times and saved 86 lives. The second lifeboat, also funded by the Licensed Victuallers, was the Licensed Victuallers II (ON 169), which was on station from November 1887 until July 1900.

In 1900, the lifeboat station was allocated a new, larger lifeboat, necessitating a bigger boathouse. Land was acquired from the local Lord of the Manor to build the new facility, which had a watch-room above the boat bay and a concrete runway down to the chalk roadway that led down to the beach. The construction cost a total of £647. The old station house was put to use as a beach shop and café, which it still is to this day.

The new lifeboat arrived on 30 July 1900, having been in storage in London since its launch and fitting out in February of the same year. She was again delivered free of cost by the Great Eastern Railway, including a launching carriage supplied by the Bristol Wagon Works Co. The new lifeboat was again funded by and named for the Licensed Victuallers, as the Licensed Victuallers III (ON 440). She was a standard self-righting ten-oared pulling lifeboat, 35 ft in length with a beam of 8 ft 3 in and a depth of 4 ft. She had two water ballast tanks, a drop keel, and eight relieving tubes. There was also a 10 ft steel sliding keel and a 17 ft 6 in bilge keel. The boat also was fitted with a sailing mast. This lifeboat was on station from July 1900 until 1931, during which time she launched a total of 19 times and is credited with saving the lives of 20 people.

1920s–1931: tractor trials and closure 
Hunstanton's position on The Wash, with its wide expanse of beach and mud flats, made launching the lifeboat at low tide particularly difficult. The RNLI began to use Hunstanton for trials to assess the use of motorised tractors to launch lifeboats across such terrain. The first trial, on 26 March 1920, successfully tested a Clayton agricultural tractor to tow the lifeboat out to the waters edge. The first specially adapted tractor was delivered to Hunstanton before the equipment was rolled out to other stations which had similar terrain.

By the early 1920s, the Hunstanton lifeboat was launched only infrequently, and the station was officially closed due to inactivity in 1931. The motor lifeboats stationed at Skegness and Wells-next-the-Sea were deemed sufficient to cover the coast of Hunstanton and The Wash.

1970s–1996: reopening and improvements 
During the 1970s, an increase in marine incidents made it clear that a lifeboat service in The Wash was once again necessary. In 1979 it was agreed that the station would re-open, so the previous boathouse was reacquired and the RNLI provided a D class inflatable ILB for a one-year trial. On 24 May a standard relief ILB D 181 was sent to the station, and Hunstanton lifeboat station was officially reopened in June 1979. In April 1980, another D-class ILB D 126 was sent to the station. The relaunched station was considered a strong success, and the RNLI sent a new Atlantic-class 21 ILB together with a new drive-on drive-of trailer and a new Talus MB-4H amphibious tractor to launch the her. In December 1982 a new lifeboat arrived to replace the Atlantic 21. She was named Spirit of America (B 556) on 11 May 1983 by Vice Admiral Donald D. Engen, a retired US Navy officer and the former president of the Association for Rescue at Sea.

More improvements were made to the facilities in 1996. The Spirit of America was refitted with more powerful 70 horse power engines and GPS equipment, returning to the station on 2 December 1996.

2001–present: hovercraft 
In 2001 Hunstanton was one of five lifeboat stations chosen for evaluation trials on a rescue hovercraft, the others being Morecombe, Flint, West Kirby and Southend-on-Sea. The hovercraft spent approximately two weeks at each station where local crew members were shown how to fly the craft. The trials were considered a success, and on 2 May 2003, the Hunstanton Flyer (Civil Service No. 54) (H-003) arrived on station. The hovercraft was officially named on 21 May 2005 and handed to the station on 25 July 2003. She had been built by Griffon of Southampton at a cost of £122,000, funded from the Lifeboat Fund of the staff and pensioners of the Civil Service, Royal Mail and British Telecom. She weighs 2,500 kg and has a hull made from marine grade aluminium and fibre reinforced composite. The hovercraft is powered by twin VW Golf turbo diesel engines.

Fleet

All Weather Boats

Inshore lifeboats

Hovercraft lifeboats

See also 
List of RNLI stations

References 

Hunstanton
Lifeboat stations in Norfolk